Hillview High School is a public English medium co-educational high school situated in the suburb of Roseville in the city of  Pretoria in the Gauteng province of South Africa.

Sport
Sport is not compulsory, as the school believes that the success and enjoyment is with voluntary participation.

Sporting facilities include, athletics grounds, several tennis courts and hockey fields, a basketball court (outdoor), several netball fields and soccer fields.

The School offers the following sports:

 Athletics
 Basketball
 Chess
 Cricket
 Cross Country
 Field Hockey
 Football
 Netball
 Softball
 Swimming
 Tennis

Hillview High School is part of the Pretoria English Medium High Schools Athletics Association (PEMHSAA) which is good spirited rivalry between all the Co-ed Government Schools in Pretoria. The Schools have three meetings held a year including the Swimming Gala (held at Hillcrest Swimming Pool), Cross Country (held at the host school) and an Athletics meeting (held at Pilditch Stadium). Other schools participating in PEMHSAA are:

 Clapham High School
 The Glen High School
 Lyttelton Manor High School
 Pretoria Technical High School
 Pretoria Secondary School
 Sutherland High School, Centurion
 Willowridge High School

RCL Committee
The school has a student body run by Mr. Mphila called the Representative Council of Learner's(RCL). An annual election is held in August for the following year's council members. The students are led by the president and a deputy president.

Location
The school was founded in 1955 on the site of the former Prinshof Primary School (corner Du Toit and Dr Savage streets) near the city centre. The school moved from the city centre to Franzina Street in Roseville in 1979. The old buildings made the news after 6 July 1991 when they were bombed by members of the AWB.

Photographs

Photographs of the old school (taken in October 2007)

Photographs of the new school (taken in October 2007)

.

Motto
The school motto is Levabo oculos ("I will lift [my] eyes" in Latin). The old school anthem was based on Psalm 121 which starts with "I to the hills will lift my eyes" in the Scottish Psalter. "Levabo oculos" is the incipit of the traditional Latin version of this psalm: Levabo oculos meos in montes unde veniet auxilium mihi.

Principals
 Dr MM Phalane (current)
 Johan Hepburn (2004-2017)
 Naomi Myburgh (1993–2004)
 Geoff D Grover (1986–1993)
 McDougall (1978–1985)
 Dr Kamogelo Yves (1955-1977)

Sport Houses
The sport houses are named after cities in Greece:

 Athens-Green
 Olympia-Blue
 Sparta-Red
 Troy- Yellow

Schools in Gauteng